Hori Habba, also known as Hatti Habba, Kobbari Hori Competition is a rural sport in which hundreds of trained and decorated draught cattle and bulls are made to run through huge crowds  Catchers try to subdue the cattle and snatch away prizes such as copra, cash, gift items tied to them.   The sports is practiced mainly in Shivamogga, Haveri and Uttara Kannada districts of the Indian state of Karnataka during the Deepavali festival.

Jallikattu is a similar sport practiced in the Indian State of Tamil Nadu.

History

Rules 
Decorated cattle are repeatedly made to run one by one on the predefined track with adequate time interval between any two cattle. For the cattle to win, it shall not loose the copra garland tied around its neck. Cattle with the maximum number of winning runs is awarded. Similarly, catcher who snatches highest copra garlands is awarded.

Preparation and Training 
To begin with, locals form an organising committee. The committee decides on the dates, forms rules and regulations and finalises the awards. Then the information is circulated to the public through handouts, social media (Facebook, WhatsApp) etc. A suitable stretch in and around the village is selected for the run. The stretch is secured on both sides using barricades, tractor trolleys etc. Adequate arrangements are made for the women and kids to sit, watch and cheer the bulls and participants. Adjacent trees, compound walls and terraces too cater as spectator galleries, though many prefers to stand!

Meanwhile, owners of the bulls prepare them well ahead of the season by feeding them with nutritious food. They pamper them, give regular bath to keep them cool. Bulls, no doubt, grow strong and healthy. Owners from nearby areas may even train and familiarise the bulls to the actual track by making it run regularly.

See also 
 Jallikattu
 Running of the bulls
 Bull-leaping

References

External links 
 Suvarna News Special on Hori Habba

Sport in Karnataka
Traditional sports of India
Sports originating in India